Coyote Flats is a city in Johnson County in the U.S. state of Texas. As of the 2010 census, before the community was incorporated, the population was 312.

History

In 2009, the city of Keene wanted to annex seven parcels of land to its south, but was met with strong opposition from the parcels' residents. Judge John Neill of the 18th District Court subsequently blocked the annexation of three of the seven parcels on the grounds that they were outside of Keene's extraterritorial jurisdiction.  On March 10, 2010, 25 residents petitioned a specially called meeting of the Johnson County Commissioners Court to become incorporated as a municipality. The name "Coyote Flats" was submitted at the meeting.

An election to incorporate the City of Coyote Flats was held on May 8, 2010. The measure was approved by a vote of 76 to 11. John Barnett was sworn in as mayor on August 11.

Mayor John Barnett presented Jim McHale and Theo Embry with plaques of appreciation, recognizing their dedicated work to help establish the city of Coyote Flats in spring and summer 2010.

Geography

Coyote Flats is located at  (32.355614, –97.292037).

According to the United States Census Bureau, Coyote Flats has a total land area of 3.329  square miles (8.618 km) and a total water area of 0.035  square miles (0.091  km).

Demographics

References

Dallas–Fort Worth metroplex
Cities in Texas
Cities in Johnson County, Texas
Populated places established in 2010